Eftekharabad (also Romanized as Eftekhārābād; also known as Kalāteh-ye Gorūbānā) is a village in Esmailabad Rural District, in the Central District of Khash County, Sistan and Baluchestan Province, Iran. At the 2006 census, its population was 1,212, in 222 families.

References 

Populated places in Khash County